The Route of the Dominican Evangelisation in Guatemala is located in the highland of central Guatemala. Roughly 27 Dominican churches and other religious structures exist along the route, which extends through the Guatemalan highlands. The indigenous Maya and other ethnic groups were the targets of the evangelisation.

World Heritage Status 

See also
Route of the Franciscan Evangelisation in Guatemala
Spanish conquest of Guatemala

References 

Guatemalan culture